Kang Min-kyung (born August 3, 1990) is a South Korean singer and actress. She is one half of the duo Davichi, who rose to fame upon the release of their debut album Amaranth in 2008. Davichi has since released 3 studio albums, 6 EPs and several hit songs such as "Don't Say Goodbye", "Turtle", "Missing You Today" and "8282". Kang has also pursued acting, appearing in television dramas such as Smile, Mom (2010), Vampire Idol (2011), Haeundae Lovers (2012) and family drama The Dearest Lady (2015). On February 27, 2019, she debuted as a solo artist with her first extended play Kang Min Kyung Vol. 1.

She launched a clothing shopping mall called 'Àvie Muah' in June 2020.

Philanthropy 
On December 9, 2022 Kang donated 150 million won to Yonsei University Medical Center. to support social programs for children and adolescents.

Discography

Extended plays

Singles

Soundtrack appearances

Filmography

Television series

Television shows

Hosting

Musical

Awards and nominations

Notes

References

External links

 
 

1990 births
Living people
MBK Entertainment artists
South Korean women pop singers
South Korean contemporary R&B singers
South Korean female idols
South Korean television actresses
South Korean television personalities
Kyung Hee University alumni
People from Goyang
21st-century South Korean singers
21st-century South Korean women singers